This is a list of the 15 members of the European Parliament for Ireland elected at the 1999 European Parliament election. They served in the 1999 to 2004 session.

List

†Replaced during term, see table below for details.

Changes

See also
Members of the European Parliament 1999–2004 – List by country
List of members of the European Parliament, 1999–2004 – Full alphabetical list

External links
ElectionsIreland.org – 1999 European Parliament (Ireland) election results
European Parliament elections 1999
European Parliament office in Ireland – Irish MEPs: 1999–2004

1999
European Parliament
 List
Ireland